The 2002 Grand Prix SAR La Princesse Lalla Meryem was a women's tennis tournament played on outdoor clay courts in Casablanca, Morocco that was part of the Tier V category of the 2002 WTA Tour. It was the second edition of the tournament and was held from 8 July until 14 July 2002. Sixth-seeded Patricia Wartusch won the singles title and earned $16,000 first-prize money.

Finals

Singles

 Patricia Wartusch defeated  Klára Koukalová 5–7, 6–3, 6–3
 It was Wartusch' 1st singles title of her the year and the 2nd of her career.

Doubles

 Petra Mandula /  Patricia Wartusch defeated  Gisela Dulko /  Conchita Martínez Granados 6–2, 6–1

External links
 ITF tournament edition details
 Tournament draws

Grand Prix Sar La Princesse Lalla Meryem
Morocco Open
2002 in Moroccan tennis